Arne Jonsson (born 28 November 1931) is a Danish racing cyclist. He rode in the 1959 Tour de France.

References

1931 births
Living people
Danish male cyclists
Place of birth missing (living people)